The blistered snake eel (Callechelys papulosa) is an eel in the family Ophichthidae (worm/snake eels). It was described by John E. McCosker in 1998. It is a tropical, marine eel which is known from Papua New Guinea, in the western central Pacific Ocean. It is known to dwell at a depth of 10 metres, and to inhabit regions of sand and grass. Males can reach a maximum total length of 55.1 centimetres.

References

Ophichthidae
Fish of Papua New Guinea
blistered snake eel